Weiser Air Park  was a privately owned, public-use airport located on the Northwest Freeway (U.S. Highway 290) in Cypress, an unincorporated area of Harris County, Texas, United States.

Although most U.S. airports use the same three-letter location identifier for the FAA and IATA, Weiser Air Park was assigned EYQ by the FAA but had no designation from the IATA.

Facilities and aircraft 
It had two runways: 9/27 has a  asphalt pavement and 16/34 has a  turf surface.

For the 12-month period ending March 3, 2006, the airport had 38,020 aircraft operations, an average of 104 per day: 99.9% general aviation and 0.1% air taxi. At that time there were 75 aircraft based at this airport: 93% single-engine and 7% multi-engine.

History
The Jackson Airport grass strip was purchased by Cecil Weiser in 1951, and renamed Weiser Airpark in 1963.  The runway was paved in 1980.  Cecil died in Nov. 2017, followed by the sale of the 102 acres.

References

External links
 

Airports in Harris County, Texas
Defunct airports in Texas
Airports disestablished in 2019